Connan Keith Barrell (born 15 April 1967) is a former New Zealand rugby union player. He was a member of the New Zealand national side, the All Blacks, in 1996 and 1997, playing in four matches but no internationals.

References

1967 births
Living people
Rugby union players from Whangārei
Rugby union props
New Zealand rugby union players
New Zealand international rugby union players
Canterbury rugby union players
Crusaders (rugby union) players
Northland rugby union players
Nelson Bays rugby union players
People educated at Kamo High School